Tourism in Portland, Oregon is a profitable industry that serves many. In 2018, Portland area tourism generated $5.3 billion in direct spending by 8.6 million overnight person-trips and employs 36,360 people who were paid $1.5 billion. Overnight person-trips is from 2017; other numbers are from 2018. According to the New York Times, the dozens of karaoke bars in Portland, Oregon make it not just "the capital of karaoke" in the United States, but "one of the most exciting music scenes in America.

See also

 Tourist attractions near Portland, Oregon
 Lists of Oregon-related topics

References

Culture of Portland, Oregon
Portland, Oregon-related lists
Portland